Gennesio Liberale (or Gensio) was an Italian painter of the Venetian school. He was born at Udine, and flourished in the second half of the 16th century. He was a pupil of San Danielo da Pellegrino, and painted still lifes cabinet pieces of animals and fish.

References

16th-century Italian painters
Italian male painters
Italian Baroque painters
Italian still life painters
Painters from Venice
People from Udine